You Will is the twenty-third studio album by Canadian country pop artist Anne Murray, released in 1990 via Capitol Records. The album peaked at number 47 on the Billboard Top Country Albums chart.

The album includes the Top 10 hits "Bluebird" and "Feed This Fire". The title track was later a Top 10 hit for Patty Loveless.

Track listing

Personnel 
 Anne Murray – vocals 
 Clayton Ivey – pianos, synthesizers, Hammond B3 organ
 Doug Riley – pianos
 Mitch Humphries – synthesizers
 Mike Lawler – synthesizers
 Billy Joe Walker Jr. – acoustic guitars 
 Larry Byrom – electric guitars 
 Reggie Young – electric guitars 
 Mark O'Connor – mandolin
 Michael Rhodes – bass 
 Eddie Bayers – drums 
 Terry McMillan – harmonica, congas, wind chimes
 Rob Hajacos – fiddle
 Bergen White – string arrangements 
 The "A" Strings – strings
 Bruce Murray – backing vocals 
 Debbie Schall – backing vocals 
 Hurshall Wiggington – backing vocals 
 Curtis Young – backing vocals 
 Llana Young – backing vocals 
 Jerry Crutchfield – producer 
 Jim Cotton – digital recording
 David Boyer – digital recording assistant, assistant overdub engineer 
 Paul Goldberg – digital recording assistant
 Ken Friesen – overdub recording 
 Scott Hendricks – additional overdub recording
 Tom Perry – additional overdub recording
 Ron Reynolds – additional overdub recording
 Billy Sherrill – additional overdub recording
 Michael Colomby – assistant overdub engineer
 Patrick Hutchinson – assistant overdub engineer
 Paula Montondo – assistant overdub engineer
 John Guess – remixing 
 Russ Martin – assistant remix engineer 
 Milan Bogdan – digital editing 
 Glenn Meadows – mastering 
 Marty Craighead – production coordinator 
 Virginia Team – art direction 
 Micky Braithwaite – design 
 Denise Grant – photography 
 Sheila Yakimov – hair stylist 
 George Abbott – make-up artist
 Leonard T. Rambeau – management

Chart performance

References

1990 albums
Anne Murray albums
Capitol Records albums
Albums produced by Jerry Crutchfield